Mark S. Mastrov is an American businessman who is the co-founder and former CEO of 24 Hour Fitness. He is also part of the Sacramento Kings ownership group.

Career
The 24 Hour Fitness began in 1983 as a one-club operation called 24 Hour Nautilus. Mark Mastrov and Leonard Schlemm began the firm, with Mastrov and Schlemm remaining to continue its expansion.

In 1998 David Giampaolo and Mark Mastrov co-founded Fitness Holdings Europe, a private-equity-backed investment vehicle, to open and acquire small chains of European health clubs. Fitness Holdings Europe was merged into 24 Hour Fitness Worldwide, Inc. in 2000.
In 2010 Mastrov founded Hard Candy Fitness with Madonna and her manager Guy Oseary.

In 2013 Mastrov became a member of a new Sacramento Kings ownership group, which was led by Vivek Ranadivé.

In November 2015 he founded professional video gaming esports team NRG Esports with Gerard Kelly and Andy Miller.

Personal life
Mastrov was born in 1958 in Oakland, California. He grew up in the San Francisco Bay Area and graduated from Castro Valley High School where he played point guard. He has a bachelor's degree in business from California State University, Hayward.

References

Living people
1958 births
People from the San Francisco Bay Area
People from Oakland, California
Sacramento Kings executives
Esports team owners
California State University, East Bay alumni
NRG Esports